State Route 217 (SR 217) was a short state highway in Maine, serving as a connection to the Sebasco Harbor Resort in Phippsburg.  It was first designated in 1928, and had maintained its alignment since.  Between January and March 2007, all signage for the highway was removed.

Route description
SR 217 began at the intersection of Sebasco Road and Kenyon Road in the Phippsburg community of Sebasco Estates, near Sebasco Harbor Resort. The state route traveled south along Sebasco Road adjacent to a golf course before entering a wooded area with some houses surrounding the road. Passing Roundcove Lane, the road curves to the east to continue through the woodlands of the peninsula. After cresting a small ridge, the road winds its way around small hills to end at SR 209 in the community of Ashdale.

Junction list

References

External links

Floodgap Roadgap's RoadsAroundME: Maine State Route 217

217
Transportation in Sagadahoc County, Maine